Kevin Sacre-Dallerup (born Kevin Bignell on 23 March 1978) is a British actor. He is most famous for his performance as Jake Dean in the Channel 4 British soap opera Hollyoaks, a role he played from 2002 to 2010.

Early life
He was born in London. He attended secondary school at Aylesbury Grammar School.

Acting career
Kevin started his career at the Royal Shakespeare Company followed by TV series Night and Day for ITV in which he played Dennis Doyle from 2001 to 2002 with ex-cast member Stuart Manning then on to Hollyoaks. He left the show in May 2008. In December 2008, Kevin played the lead in Aladdin at Sheffield Lyceum Theatre. On 6 July 2009, after much speculation it was confirmed Sacre will be returning to his role as tragic, incarcerated, mentally ill Jake Dean.

Other appearances
Sacre made a cameo appearance in the Ricky Gervais show Extras. He also made a guest appearance on The Weakest Link alongside co-star Ali Bastian. Kevin took part in Living TV's The Underdog Show last summer where ten celebrities train ten rescue dogs and won the show. He also met girlfriend Camilla Dallerup to whom he is now married. Kevin was also seen on the BBC Three show Dancing on Wheels.

Personal life
He married professional dancer Camilla Dallerup on 29 July 2010 in Ibiza, two years after meeting on the set of the reality TV series The Underdog Show. Both now go by the last name Sacre-Dallerup.

References

External links

 TV.com Profile

Living people
1978 births
Alumni of Middlesex University
People educated at Aylesbury Grammar School
English male television actors
English male stage actors